The 2008 Bahrain Championship was a professional ranking snooker tournament that took place between 8 and 15 November 2008 at the Bahrain International Exhibition Centre in Manama, Bahrain. It was the fourth ranking event of the 2008/2009 season.

Due to a clash with a previously arranged Premier League match-day, three leading players (John Higgins, Mark Selby and Ding Junhui) were forced to miss the event. This meant that they earned no ranking points, with Matthew Stevens, Ken Doherty and Jamie Cope (ranked 17, 18 and 19 respectively) qualifying automatically due to the extra spaces in the draw. Likewise, the players ranked from 33–35 and 49–51 played one qualifier less than usual. Additionally, Ronnie O'Sullivan withdrew three days before the tournament for unspecified medical reasons.

Steve Davis was also involved in Premier League action, playing on 13 November, but did not withdraw from the tournament. He played his qualifying match and received a walkover due to O'Sullivan's withdrawal, meaning that he reached the last sixteen. However, before his last 16 match he withdrew from the event as an ear infection prevented him from flying to Bahrain.

Liang Wenbo made the 65th official maximum break during his qualifying match against Martin Gould. This was Liang's first official 147. Marcus Campbell made the 66th official maximum break during his wildcard round match against Ahmed Basheer Al-Khusaibi. This was Campbell's first official 147.
 
Neil Robertson won his third ranking title by defeating Matthew Stevens 9–7.

Prize fund
The breakdown of prize money for this year is shown below: 

Winner: £48,000
Runner-up: £22,500
Semi-final: £12,000
Quarter-final: £6,500
Last 16: £4,275
Last 32: £2,750
Last 48: £1,725
Last 64: £1,325

Stage one highest break: £500
Stage two highest break: £2,000
Stage one maximum break: £1,000
Stage two maximum break: £20,000
Total: £271,000

Wildcard round
The 6 lowest ranking qualifiers played one wildcard match each. Matches were played at Bahrain International Exhibition Centre on Saturday, 8 November.

Main draw

Final

Qualifying
Qualifying for the tournament took place at Pontins in Prestatyn, Wales between 27 and 30 October 2008.

Century breaks

Qualifying stage centuries

147, 139, 139, 115  Liang Wenbo
137  Dominic Dale
136  Atthasit Mahitthi
135  Li Hang
131, 126  Rory McLeod
128  Alan McManus
127  Kuldesh Johal
124  Liu Chuang

122  Jin Long
122, 114, 103  Judd Trump
111  Michael Holt
110  Scott MacKenzie
105, 100  Fergal O'Brien
105  Robert Milkins
101  Vincent Muldoon

Televised stage centuries

 147  Marcus Campbell
 139, 132, 113, 111, 106  Stephen Hendry
 137, 114, 102  Robert Milkins
 129, 117, 116, 100  Neil Robertson
 123  Joe Perry
 123  Barry Hawkins
 122  Stephen Maguire
 120  Ricky Walden
 120, 116, 110  Matthew Stevens

 119, 112, 111, 105  Mark Allen
 118  Peter Ebdon
 117  Dave Harold
 112, 100  Barry Pinches
 110  Graeme Dott
 105  Michael Holt
 101  Mike Dunn
 100  Rod Lawler
 100  Ali Carter

See also

 Dubai Classic

References

Bahrain Championship
Snooker Championship
Snooker ranking tournaments